Sara Luna Santana (born 16 April 1977 in Barcelona) is a goalball player from Spain.  She is blind. She is a type B2 goalball player. She played goalball at the 1996 Summer Paralympics. Her team was third. She played goalball at the 2000 Summer Paralympics.  Her team was second.

References

External links 
 
 

1977 births
Living people
Paralympic goalball players of Spain
Paralympic silver medalists for Spain
Paralympic bronze medalists for Spain
Paralympic medalists in goalball
Goalball players at the 1996 Summer Paralympics
Goalball players at the 2000 Summer Paralympics
Medalists at the 1996 Summer Paralympics
Medalists at the 2000 Summer Paralympics
Sportspeople from Barcelona